is a Japanese trade association established in 2002 for international distribution of Japanese content (frequently anime and manga) and taking countermeasures against piracy.

In 2013, CODA merged with Anti-Counterfeiting Association (ACA), in order to strengthen our capability for copyright protection and offer comprehensive measures against copyright infringement in Japan as well as overseas.

In 2022, CODA established the International Anti-Piracy Organization (IAPO), with associating 32 members, the Motion Picture Association, and Copyright Society of China within approximately 450 members.

Content Japan mark 
Content Japan (or CJ Mark) was created in 2005 by the Anti-Counterfeiting Association, it can be seen on packages in music, videos and other media.

See also
Alliance for Creativity and Entertainment, a similar anti-piracy organization for films and TV series

References

External links 
 Official website 

Japanese copyright law
Arts and media trade groups
Organizations established in 2002
Trade associations based in Japan